This is an article showing the matches of Levante UD women's team in UEFA international competitions. Levante has appeared in three occasions in the UEFA Women's Cup, including the 2001-02 inaugural edition.

Overall record

2001-02 UEFA Women's Cup

First stage

2002-03 UEFA Women's Cup

First stage

2008-09 UEFA Women's Cup

Preliminary stage

First stage

References

European football
Levante